"Chasing the Light" is the second and lead single from Amy Studt's second album My Paper Made Men.

Music video
The video for the song was shot on March 14, 2008 on the news section on the website it said that the music video "includes wind, water and paint". It shows Amy in a black dress and barefoot standing in a black room singing the song, and throughout the video she is sprayed with water and then is covered in blue paint. As the song ends the paint falls off her and she is once again back to her original state.

References

Amy Studt songs
2008 singles
Songs written by Sam Watters
Songs written by Louis Biancaniello
2008 songs
Songs written by Amy Studt
19 Recordings singles
Grunge songs
Post-grunge songs